The Los Angeles Film Critics Association Award for Best Screenplay is one of the annual film awards given by the Los Angeles Film Critics Association.

Winners

1970s

1980s

1990s

2000s

2010s

2020s

See also
Academy Award for Best Adapted Screenplay
Academy Award for Best Original Screenplay

References

Los Angeles Film Critics Association Awards
Screenwriting awards for film